John Roland Robinson, 1st Baron Martonmere,  (22 February 1907 – 3 May 1989) was a British Conservative Party politician who later served as Governor of Bermuda from 1964 to 1972.

Early life
Robinson was born on 22 February 1907. He was the son of solicitor Roland Walkden Robinson of Blackpool and the former Mary Collier Pritchard, a daughter of Joseph Pritchard, also of Blackpool.

He was educated at Trinity Hall, Cambridge, and was called to the Bar at Lincoln's Inn in 1929.

Career
He was elected at the 1931 general election as Member of Parliament (MP) for Widnes, a seat he held until 1935, when he was elected for Blackpool. He held that seat until the constituency was divided at the 1945 election, when he was elected for Blackpool South, holding that seat until he retired from the House of Commons at the 1964 general election.

Robinson never held ministerial office but was Chairman of the Conservative Commonwealth Affairs Committee in the House of Commons from 1954 to 1964. He was knighted in 1954, admitted in 1962 to the Privy Council, and in 1964 was raised to the peerage as Baron Martonmere, of Blackpool in the County Palatine of Lancaster. During the latter year, he was also appointed Governor of Bermuda, a post he held until 1972.

Personal life
In 1930 Robinson was married to Maysie Gasque, daughter of Clarence Warren Gasque. After moving to Bermuda, they spent summers at Romay House, Tucker's Town and winters at Lyford Cay. They had one son and one daughter:

 Richard Robinson (1935–1979), who married Wendy Patricia Blagden, a daughter of James Cecil Blagden, of Bapchild Court, in 1959.
 Loretta Robinson (1939–2022), who married Edward S. Rogers Jr., a Canadian businessman who founded Rogers Communications, in 1963.

Robinson died at his home in Lyford Cay, Nassau, Bahamas, in May 1989, at the age of 82. He was succeeded in the Barony of Martonmere by his grandson, John Stephen Robinson (b. 1963).

Descendants
Through his daughter Loretta, he was a grandfather of Lisa Anne Rogers, Edward S. Rogers III, Melinda Mary Rogers, and Martha Loretta Rogers.

Arms

References

External links 
 Cracroft's Peerage page
 
 John Roland Robinson, 1st Baron Martonmere at National Portrait Gallery, London

1907 births
1989 deaths
Robinson, Roland
Knights Grand Cross of the Order of the British Empire
Knights Commander of the Order of St Michael and St George
Members of the Privy Council of the United Kingdom
Robinson, Roland
Robinson, Roland
Robinson, Roland
Robinson, Roland
Robinson, Roland
Robinson, Roland
Robinson, Roland
UK MPs who were granted peerages
Governors of Bermuda
Alumni of Trinity Hall, Cambridge
Hereditary barons created by Elizabeth II
Members of Lincoln's Inn